The Zabbar Ground better known by its nickname Il-Foss is a football ground in Ħaż-Żabbar, Malta. It is the home ground of Maltese football club Zabbar St. Patrick. It was built in 1972 with construction debris on the old ditch (hence 'il-foss') located in front of the Notre Dame Bastion on the outer perimeter of the famous Cottonera Lines of fortifications.

As originally built the ground did not have a full size pitch but had a concrete stand behind the south end goalpost with a capacity of about 1,000 spectators. This was later demolished to extend the pitch to 100 metres in length.

The ground is used for training sessions of the youth teams all the way up to the first team. It has a small capacity of 1,000 standing spectators but plans exist to build a grand stand with a seated capacity of 1,600 spectators. The ground was extensively renovated during the 2007–2008 season when the pitch was upgraded from sand to artificial turf.

Football venues in Malta
Żabbar
St. Patrick F.C.